Renia mortualis is a litter moth of the family Erebidae. It is found in North America, including and possibly limited to the Huachuca Mountains of Arizona. The species was first described by William Barnes and James Halliday McDunnough in 1912.

External links
Moths of south-eastern Arizona

Herminiinae
Moths described in 1912